Simona Meiler (born 13 September 1989 in Flims) is a Swiss snowboarder. She has represented Switzerland at the 2010 Winter Olympics in Vancouver and the 2014 Winter Olympics in Sochi.

References

1989 births
Snowboarders at the 2010 Winter Olympics
Snowboarders at the 2014 Winter Olympics
Snowboarders at the 2018 Winter Olympics
Living people
Olympic snowboarders of Switzerland
Swiss female snowboarders
Universiade medalists in snowboarding
Lesbian sportswomen
Swiss LGBT sportspeople
LGBT snowboarders
Universiade bronze medalists for Switzerland
Competitors at the 2015 Winter Universiade
21st-century Swiss women